Lislkirchnerite is a rare nitrate mineral  with the formula Pb6Al(OH)8Cl2(NO3)5•2H2O. It was discovered in Nueva Esperanza No. 1 mine within the Capillitas deposit, Catamarca, Argentina.

Similar minerals
Lislkirchnerite is the first mineral with combined lead and nitrate. The structure of the mineral is unique.

References

Nitrate minerals
Lead minerals
Aluminium minerals
Monoclinic minerals
Minerals in space group 14